Mattawan is a municipality in the Canadian province of Ontario. Located in the Nipissing District, the municipality had a population of 161 in the Canada 2016 Census.

The municipality has no named communities within its boundaries; all addresses within the municipality are rural routes assigned to the neighbouring town of Mattawa.

Its main access road is Highway 533, with Highway 656 as a short branch leading to the Otto Holden Generating Station on the Ottawa River.

In 2007, Mattawan, along with the town of Mattawa and the townships of Papineau-Cameron, Bonfield and Calvin cooperated to create a newly branded Mattawa Voyageur Country tourist region in order to promote the area.

Demographics 

See also
List of townships in Ontario
List of francophone communities in Ontario

References

External links

Municipalities in Nipissing District
Single-tier municipalities in Ontario